Drăgoești may refer to several places in Romania:

 Drăgoești, Ialomița, a commune in Ialomița County
 Drăgoești, Vâlcea, a commune in Vâlcea County